Caloria indica is a species of sea slug, an aeolid nudibranch, a marine gastropod mollusc in the family Facelinidae.

Description
The size of the body varies between 25 mm and 50 mm.

Distribution
This species was described from Ambon Island, Indonesia. It occurs in the Indo-West Pacific from East Africa to Hawaii; also as an invasive species in the Israeli part of the Mediterranean Sea, first recorded in the late 1980s and then again in 2016.

References

External links 
 
 NCBI
 

Facelinidae
Gastropods described in 1896